Andrzej Teodor Seweryn (born 25 April 1946) is a Polish actor and director. One of the most successful Polish theatre actors, he starred in over 50 films, mostly in Poland, France, and Germany. He is also one of only three non-French actors to be hired by the Paris-based Comédie-Française. He is currently serving as director general of the Polski Theatre in Warsaw. He has three children with three different wives: a daughter, Maria Seweryn (born 1975) with his first wife, Polish actress Krystyna Janda, and two sons, Yann-Baptiste and Maximilien.

Life and career 
Andrzej Seweryn was born on 25 April 1946 in Heilbronn, Germany. His parents, Zdzisław and Zofia, were captured and forced into slave labor in Germany during World War II. After the birth of Andrzej, they returned to Poland. In 1968 he graduated from the National Academy of Dramatic Art in Warsaw and worked at Teatr Ateneum where he continued to act until 1980.

Already in the 1970s he gained much fame following his appearance in numerous films directed by Andrzej Wajda, notably Without Anesthesia, The Promised Land and the Man of Iron. For his role in Wajda's 1980 Dyrygent Seweryn received the Silver Bear for Best Actor at the 30th Berlin International Film Festival. In 1980 Seweryn also made his stage debut in France following the staging of Wajda's interpretation of plays by Stanisław Witkiewicz at the Théâtre Nanterre-Amandiers.

The imposition of the martial law in Poland in 1981 found Seweryn in France. A sympathiser of the outlawed Solidarity, he decided to stay abroad and settle in France. With time he also applied for French citizenship. During his stay in France he collaborated with some of the most renowned theatre directors. Among them were Claude Régy (La Trilogie du revoir and Grand et Petit by Botho Strauss), Patrice Chéreau (Peer Gynt by Ibsen), Peter Brook (The Mahabharata), Bernard Sobel (Nathan the Wise by Gotthold Ephraim Lessing, The Good Person of Szechwan by Bertold Brecht, Tartuffe by Molière), Deborah Warner (A Doll's House by Henrik Ibsen), Antoine Vitez (L'Échange by Paul Claudel), Jacques Rosner (The Cherry Orchard by Anton Chekhov and Breakfast with Wittgenstein based on a novel by Thomas Bernhard), and Jacques Lassalle (Jedermann by Hugo von Hofmannsthal and The Misanthrope by Molière).

Since 1993 he has performed in Comédie Française in Paris (receiving full membership in 1995, as the third non-French in the history of that theatre) and taught at the Paris Conservatoire. In 1996 he received Witkacy Prize - Critics' Circle Award. For his contribution to French culture in 2005 was awarded with Légion d'honneur, in addition to Ordre des Arts et des Lettres and Ordre national du Mérite.

Andrzej Seweryn appeared in over 50 motion pictures, most them Polish, French and German productions. He is best known in the United States for his portrayal as Julian Scherner in the film Schindler's List. Seweryn was allegedly chosen for the role of Scherner since he bore a striking physical resemblance to the actual Julian Scherner, based upon photographic evidence from World War II.
He has also portrayed the French Revolutionary leader Maximilien Robespierre, in the film and mini-series La Révolution française (1989) ('The French Revolution').

His 2006 film Who Never Lived was entered into the 28th Moscow International Film Festival.

In 2016, he won the Best Actor Award at the Locarno International Film Festival for the film The Last Family.

Filmography

 Beata (1965) as Pupil
 Album polski (1970, a.k.a. Polish Album) as Tomek
 Przejście podziemne (1974, TV Short, a.k.a. The Underground Passage) as Stach
 Ziemia Obiecana (1975, a.k.a. The Promised Land) as Maks Baum
 Noce i dnie (1975, a.k.a. Nights and Days) as Anzelm Ostrzenski
 Opadły liście z drzew (1975, a.k.a. Leaves Have Fallen) as Smukły
 Zaklęte rewiry (1975, a.k.a. Hotel Pacific) as Henek (voice)
 Obrazki z życia (1975, a.k.a. Pictures From Life) as Writer
 Polskie drogi (1977, TV Series) as Sturmbannführer Kliefhorn
 Człowiek z marmuru (1977) a.k.a. Man of Marble as Reader (voice)
 Długa noc poślubna (1977, TV Movie a.k.a. Long Honeymoon)
 Granica (1978, a.k.a. The Limit) as Zenon Ziembiewicz
 Bez znieczulenia (1978) a.k.a. Without Anesthesia as Jerzy Rosciszewski
 Bestia (1978, a.k.a. Beast) as Ksiadz
 Roman i Magda (1979, a.k.a. Roman and Magda) as Roman Barwinski
 Rodzina Połanieckich (1979, TV Series) as Bukacki
 Kung-Fu (1979) as Marek Kaminski
 Dyrygent (1980, a.k.a. Orchestra Conductor) as Adam Pietryk
 Golem (1980) as Doctor Creating Pernat
 Człowiek z żelaza (1981) a.k.a. Man of Iron as Kapt. Wirski
 Dziecinne pytania (1981, a.k.a. Childish Questions) as Bogdan
 Peer Gynt (1981, TV Movie) as Le cuisinier / Le propriétaire d'Haegstad / Le père de la mariée
 Najdłuższa wojna nowoczesnej Europy (1982, TV Series) as Hipolit Cegielski
 Roza (1982)
 Danton (1983) as Bourdon
 Marynia (1984) as Edward Bukacki
 Haute Mer (1985, TV Movie)
 Qui trop embrasse... (1986) as Marc
 La Femme de ma vie (1986, a.k.a. Women of My Life) as Bernard
 La Coda del diavolo (1986, a.k.a. The Malady of Love) as The pedlar
 Na srebrnym globie (1987, a.k.a. The Silver Globe) as Marek
 La Révolution française (film) (1989, 'The French Revolution') as Maximilien-Marie-Isidore De Robespierre
 The Mahabharata (1989, TV Mini-Series) as Yudhishthira
 La bonne Âme de Setchouan (1990, TV Movie) as Wang
 Napoléon et l'Europe (1991, TV Series)
 La Condanna (1991, a.k.a. The Conviction) as Giovanni, Public attorney
 Indochine (1992) as Hebrard
 L'Échange (1992, Short)
 
 Schindler's List (1993) as Julian Scherner
 Podróż na wschód (1994, TV Movie, a.k.a. A Journey East) as Jakub
 Le Fils du cordonnier (1994, TV Mini-Series) as Célestin
 Ohnivé jaro (1994)
 Total Eclipse (1995) as Mr. Maute De Fleurville
 Lucie Aubrac (1997) as Lt. Schlondorf
 Généalogies d'un crime (1997, a.k.a. Genealogies of a Crime) as Christian
 Billboard (1998) as Agency Manager
 Ogniem i mieczem (1999, a.k.a. With Fire and Sword) as Jeremi Wiśniowiecki
 Pan Tadeusz (1999, a.k.a. Tadeusz or the Last Foray in Lithuania) as Judge Soplica
 Prymas - trzy lata z tysiąca (2000, a.k.a. The Primate) as Stefan Wyszyński
 Zemsta (2002, a.k.a. The Revenge) as Rejent Milczek
 Par amour (2003, TV Movie) as François
 À ton image (2004) as Professor Cardoze
 Kto nigdy nie żył... (2006) as Ordynator
 Ekipa (2007, TV Series) as President Juliusz Szczęsny
 Laa rounde de nuit (2007, a.k.a. Nightwatching) as Piers Hasselburg
 La Possibilité d'une île (2008) as Slotan
 Różyczka (2010, a.k.a. Little Rose) as Adam Warczewski
 Uwikłanie (2011) as Witold
 You Ain't Seen Nothin' Yet! (2012) as Marcellin
 Sep (2013) as Reatorski
 Zblizenia (2014) as Andrzej Milewski
 Anatomia zla (2015) as Roman Szerepeta
 The Last Family (2016) as Zdzisław Beksiński
 The Mire (2018, TV series) as Witold Wanycz
 Solid Gold (2018) as Tadeusz Kawecki
 The Mire97 (2021, TV series) as Witold Wanycz
 Queen  (2022, TV series) as Sylwester / Loretta

References

External links

 Biography of Andrzej Seweryn
 

{

1946 births
20th-century Polish male actors
21st-century Polish male actors
Knights of the Ordre national du Mérite
Recipients of the Legion of Honour
Living people
People from Heilbronn
Polish expatriates in France
Polish film directors
Polish male film actors
Polish male stage actors
Polish male television actors
Polish Roman Catholics
Silver Bear for Best Actor winners
Sociétaires of the Comédie-Française
Aleksander Zelwerowicz National Academy of Dramatic Art in Warsaw alumni